In game theory, Kuhn's theorem relates perfect recall, mixed and unmixed strategies and their expected payoffs. It is named after Harold W. Kuhn.

The theorem states that in a game where players may remember all of their previous moves/states of the game available to them, for every mixed strategy there is a behavioral strategy that has an equivalent payoff (i.e. the strategies are equivalent).  The theorem does not specify what this strategy is, only that it exists.  It is valid both for finite games, as well as infinite games (i.e. games with continuous choices, or iterated infinitely).

References

Game theory
Mathematical economics
Economics theorems